is a former Japanese football player.

Playing career
Ihara was born in Saga Prefecture on 8 March 1973. After graduating from high school, he joined NKK in 1991. Although he played in many matches, the club was disbanded at the end of the 1993 season. In 1994, he moved to the Japan Football League (JFL) club Kyoto Purple Sanga. He played often as a defensive midfielder from 1994 and the club was promoted to the J1 League in 1996. While there, he mainly played as center back. In 1998, he moved to the JFL club Sagan Tosu based in his local league. The club was promoted to the J2 League in 1999. He played in many matches as a defensive midfielder until early in the 2000 season and as a center back of a three backs defense from the middle of the 2000 season. In 2001, he moved to Shonan Bellmare. He played in many matches as a defensive midfielder and as a center back for three seasons and retired at the end of the 2003 season.

Club statistics

References

External links

kyotosangadc

1973 births
Living people
Association football people from Saga Prefecture
Japanese footballers
Japan Soccer League players
J1 League players
J2 League players
Japan Football League (1992–1998) players
NKK SC players
Kyoto Sanga FC players
Sagan Tosu players
Shonan Bellmare players
Association football defenders